Kiladhari is a village in Tiruppuvanam taluk in Sivaganga district of Tamil Nadu state, India.

Geography
It is located  20 km west of the district headquarters Sivaganga, 15 km from Tiruppuvanam and 476 km from the state capital Chennai.
Nearby villages include Thamarakki (north) (6 km), Thamarakki (south) (6 km), Kumarapatti (8 km), Mudikandam (9 km) and Padamathur (9 km).

Kiladhari is surrounded by Melur taluk to the North, Sivaganga taluk to the East, Madurai West Taluk to the west and Madurai East Taluk to the west.

Thirupuvanam, Sivaganga, Madurai and Natham are the nearest cities to Kiladhari.

This place is along the border of the Sivaganga District and Madurai District.

Description
Kiladhari is one of the villages amongst the 4 Magaanam along with Thamarakki the motherland and other villages Arasanoor and Iluppakkudi. Kiladhari has lot of agriculture lands with 9 Kanmays and 80 Yendhals.

Azhiyanachi Amman Temple and Nerudamadai Ayyanar Swamy Temple are the major temples in Kiladhari. These temples held festivals annually.

Transport
There are no railway stations within Kiladhari and the nearest station, Madurai Junction railway station, is 27 km away.
Buses run from Mattuthavani Bus Terminus to Kilathari.

Education
Nearby colleges:
K.L.N College of Engineering 11 km
Vickram College of Engineering
RASS Academy College of Nursing
VIKRAM Teacher Training College

Schools:
P.U.mid.school Kiladhari

References

Villages in Sivaganga district